Theobromine, also known as xantheose, is the principal alkaloid of Theobroma cacao (cacao plant). Theobromine is slightly water-soluble (330 mg/L) with a bitter taste. In industry, theobromine is used as an additive and precursor to some cosmetics. It is found in chocolate, as well as in a number of other foods, including the leaves of the tea plant, and the kola nut. It is a white or colourless solid, but commercial samples can appear yellowish.

Structure
Theobromine is a flat molecule, a derivative of purine. It is also classified as a dimethyl xanthine. Related compounds include theophylline, caffeine, paraxanthine, and 7-methylxanthine, each of which differ in the number or placement of the methyl groups.

History
Theobromine was first discovered in 1841 in cacao beans by Russian chemist A. Woskresensky. Synthesis of theobromine from xanthine was first reported in 1882 by Hermann Emil Fischer.

Etymology
Theobromine is derived from Theobroma, the name of the genus of the cacao tree, with the suffix -ine given to alkaloids and other basic nitrogen-containing compounds. That name in turn is made up of the Greek roots theo ("god") and broma ("food"), meaning "food of the gods".

Despite its name, the compound contains no bromine, which is based on Greek bromos ("stench").

Sources

Theobromine is the primary alkaloid found in cocoa and chocolate. Cocoa butter only contains trace amounts of theobromine. There are usually higher concentrations in dark than in milk chocolate.

Cocoa beans naturally contain approximately 1% theobromine.

Plant species and components with substantial amounts of theobromine are:

 Theobroma cacao – seed and seed coat
 Theobroma bicolor – seed coat
 Ilex paraguariensis – leaf
 Camellia sinensis – leaf

Theobromine can also be found in trace amounts in the kola nut, the guarana berry, yerba mate (Ilex paraguariensis), Ilex vomitoria, Ilex guayusa, and the tea plant.

The mean theobromine concentrations in cocoa and carob products are:

Biosynthesis
Theobromine is a purine alkaloid derived from xanthosine, a nucleoside.  Cleavage of the ribose and N-methylation yields 7-methylxanthosine.  7-Methylxanthosine in turn is the precursor to theobromine, which in turn is the precursor to caffeine.

Pharmacology

Even without dietary intake, theobromine may occur in the body as it is a product of the human metabolism of caffeine, which is metabolised in the liver into 12% theobromine, 4% theophylline, and 84% paraxanthine.

In the liver, theobromine is metabolized into xanthine and subsequently into methyluric acid. Important enzymes include CYP1A2 and CYP2E1. The elimination half life of theobromine is between 6 to 8 hours.

Unlike caffeine, which is highly water soluble, theobromine is only slightly water soluble and is more fat soluble, and thus peaks more slowly in the blood. While caffeine peaks after only 30 minutes, theobromine requires 2-3 hours to peak. 

"The main mechanism of action for methylxanthines has long been established as an inhibition of adenosine receptors".  Its effect as a phosphodiesterase inhibitor is thought to be small.

Effects

Humans
Theobromine has no significant stimulant effect on the human central nervous system. It is a bronchodilator and causes relaxation of vascular smooth muscle. It is not currently used as a prescription drug. The amount of theobromine found in chocolate is small enough that chocolate can, in general, be safely consumed by humans.

Compared with caffeine, theobromine is weaker in both its inhibition of cyclic nucleotide phosphodiesterases and its antagonism of adenosine receptors. The potential phosphodiesterase inhibitory effect of theobromine is seen only at amounts much higher than what people normally would consume in a typical diet including chocolate.

Toxicity
At doses of 0.8–1.5 g/day (50–100 g cocoa), sweating, trembling and severe headaches were noted, with limited mood effects found at 250 mg/day.

Also, chocolate may be a factor for heartburn in some people because theobromine may affect the esophageal sphincter muscle in a way that permits stomach acids to enter the esophagus.

Animals
Theobromine is the reason chocolate is poisonous to dogs. The concentration of theobromine in dark chocolates (approximately ) is up to 10 times that of milk chocolate – meaning dark chocolate is far more toxic to dogs per unit weight or volume than milk chocolate.

The same risk is reported for cats as well, although cats are less likely to ingest sweet food, as cats lack sweet taste receptors. Complications include digestive issues, dehydration, excitability, and a slow heart rate. Later stages of theobromine poisoning include epileptic-like seizures and death. If caught early on, theobromine poisoning is treatable. Although not common, the effects of theobromine poisoning can be fatal.

See also 
 Health effects of chocolate
 History of chocolate
 Theodrenaline

References 

Adenosine receptor antagonists
Bitter compounds
Components of chocolate
IARC Group 3 carcinogens
Phosphodiesterase inhibitors
Xanthines